Michele Dancelli (born 8 May 1942) is an Italian former road racing cyclist. His main victories include  one Milan–San Remo (1970), the 1966 Flèche Wallonne, three editions of the Giro dell'Appennino (1965–1967), two Trofeo Laigueglia (1968 and 1970). He also won 11 stages in total in the Giro d'Italia and one stage in the 1969 Tour de France.

Major results

1963
 1st  Road race, National Amateur Road Championships
 3rd Giro di Lombardia
 9th Giro dell'Emilia
1964
 1st Gran Premio Industria e Commercio di Prato
 1st Stage 2 Giro d'Italia
 1st Corsa Coppi
 1st Col San Martino
 3rd Giro di Campania
 4th Coppa Placci
 6th Giro di Lombardia
1965
 1st  Road race, National Road Championships
 1st Stages 1 & 5 Giro d'Italia
 1st Giro del Veneto
 1st Giro dell'Appennino
 1st Grand Prix de Cannes
 1st Gran Premio Industria e Commercio di Prato
 1st Giro di Campania
 1st GP Montelupo
 1st Coppa Placci
 1st Giro dell'Emilia
 2nd Trofeo Baracchi
 2nd Coppa Bernocchi
 2nd Tre Valli Varesine
 2nd Milano–Vignola
 7th Giro di Lombardia
 9th Overall Tour de Romandie
1st Stage 4
1966
 1st  Road race, National Road Championships
 1st La Flèche Wallonne
 1st Stage 18 Giro d'Italia
 1st Giro del Lazio
 1st Giro del Veneto
 1st Giro dell'Appennino
 1st Giro della Provincia di Reggio Calabria
 1st Stage 7 Paris–Nice
 1st Overall Cronostaffetta (TTT)
 2nd Corsa Coppi
 2nd Gran Premio Industria e Commercio di Prato
 2nd Milano–Torino
 3rd Genoa–Nice
 3rd Coppa Bernocchi
 4th Milan–San Remo
 4th Tre Valli Varesine
 5th Giro di Lombardia
 6th Liège–Bastogne–Liège
 6th GP Lugano
 9th Overall Paris–Luxembourg
 10th Giro di Romagna
1967
 1st Coppa Sabatini
 1st Giro dell'Appennino
 1st Giro della Provincia di Reggio Calabria
 1st Gran Premio Industria e Commercio di Prato
 1st Stages 3 & 15 Giro d'Italia
 1st Giro dell'Emilia
 1st Corsa Coppi
 2nd Road race, National Road Championships
 2nd Coppa Bernocchi
 2nd Coppa Placci
 3rd Coppa Agostoni
 3rd Trofeo Matteotti
 3rd Giro delle Tre Provincie
 4th GP Alghero
 5th Overall Tirreno–Adriatico
 7th Trofeo Laigueglia
 8th Road race, UCI Road World Championships
1968
 1st Overall Paris–Luxembourg
1st Stage 1
 1st Giro della Provincia di Reggio Calabria
 1st Trofeo Laigueglia
 2nd Trofeo Matteotti
 2nd Tre Valli Varesine
 3rd  Road race, UCI Road World Championships
 3rd Road race, National Road Championships
 3rd Milano–Torino
 6th Overall Giro d'Italia
 6th Overall Giro di Sardegna
 6th Giro dell'Emilia
 8th Overall Tour de Romandie
1st Stage 2
 8th Giro di Lombardia
 9th Overall Tirreno–Adriatico
1969
 1st Stage 8b Tour de France
 1st GP Cemab
 1st Overall Cronostaffetta (TTT)
1st Stage 1c (ITT)
 2nd Rund um den Henninger Turm
 2nd Giro del Veneto
 2nd Romana Lombardo
 3rd  Road race, UCI Road World Championships
 4th Tre Valli Varesine
 6th Overall Giro d'Italia
1st Stage 9
 6th Tour of Flanders
 10th Overall Tour de Romandie
1st Stage 4
1970
 1st Milan–San Remo
 1st Giro del Lazio
 1st Trofeo Laigueglia
 1st Prologue Tour de Luxembourg
 3rd Giro dell'Emilia
 4th Overall Giro d'Italia
1st Stages 11, 13, 14 & 18
 4th Tre Valli Varesine
 9th Giro di Lombardia
1971
 1st Grand Prix de Saint-Raphaël
 1st Stage 3b Giro di Sardegna
 4th Giro di Romagna
 5th Giro di Toscana
 7th Road race, UCI Road World Championships
 9th Gran Premio Città di Camaiore
1972
 3rd Overall Tour de Suisse
1st Stages 4 & 6a
 3rd Road race, National Road Championships
 3rd Tre Valli Varesine
 4th GP Alghero
 5th Giro di Puglia
 6th Road race, UCI Road World Championships
 6th Milan–San Remo
 7th Coppa Placci
 7th Overall Giro di Sardegna
 10th Giro di Lombardia
1973
 2nd Giro di Romagna
 2nd Giro di Sicilia
 3rd Overall Giro di Puglia 
 3rd Giro dell'Appennino
 3rd Giro delle Marche
 8th Coppa Sabatini
 8th Coppa Placci
 10th Milano–Vignola
1974
 8th Overall Giro di Sardegna
 9th GP Cemab

References

External links

Italian male cyclists
Italian Tour de France stage winners
Italian Giro d'Italia stage winners
Cyclists from the Province of Brescia
1942 births
Living people
Tour de Suisse stage winners